Airdevronsix Icefalls is a line of icefalls at the head of Wright Upper Glacier, in Victoria Land, Antarctica. Named by U.S. Navy Operation Deepfreeze (1956–57) for U.S. Navy Air Development Squadron Six, which had been formed to provide air support for the Deep Freeze operations and which had also carried out many important Antarctic exploratory flights.

It has formed on Jurassic dolerite sill, which has intruded in Devonian - Triassic sandstone.

References

Glaciers of Victoria Land
Landforms of Victoria Land
Scott Coast